Love Child is the fifteenth studio album released by Diana Ross & the Supremes for the Motown label in 1968. The LP was the group's first studio LP (excepting covers and tribute albums) not to include any songs written or produced by any member of the Holland–Dozier–Holland production team, who had previously overseen most of the Supremes' releases.

Overview
Several different producers and production teams worked on the Love Child LP. Nickolas Ashford & Valerie Simpson, the production team behind the Marvin Gaye & Tammi Terrell hit singles, wrote and produced the album's first single, "Some Things You Never Get Used To". The single peaked at number 30 on the Billboard Hot 100, the Supremes' weakest chart showing since 1963. Wanting to improve the group's waning sales, Motown CEO Berry Gordy assembled a team (Frank Wilson, Pam Sawyer, Deke Richards, Henry Cosby, R. Dean Taylor, and Gordy himself)  to create a hit single for The Supremes. The result was "Love Child", which returned the Supremes to the Billboard Hot 100's number-one position. Staff producers such as Smokey Robinson, Harvey Fuqua, and Johnny Bristol also contributed to the album.

The tracks on Love Child show a markedly different sound for The Supremes, eschewing the soul-pop sound Holland-Dozier-Holland had masterminded for a more distinct, mature sound and lyric. During its four years as a Top 40 pop act, The Supremes had gone from playing local venues to performing in expensive supper clubs, and the change in sound reflected the group's new fanbase. The new Supremes recordings also, according to Supremes member Mary Wilson, emphasized "[lead singer Diana Ross'] voice at the expense of any good harmonies". Wilson and third Supreme Cindy Birdsong do not in fact appear on either of the LP's singles (Motown session singers The Andantes instead sing backing vocals on these as well as on some other of the album's tracks), although Wilson and Birdsong are present on some of the album's tracks.

The album is considered one of the most mature in their vast body of work. Originally conceived as a more socially topical album, songs like "Does Your Mama Know About Me", "(He's My) Sunny Boy" and the title track along with its follow-up, "I'm Livin' in Shame" conveyed a snapshot of what love might be for a young woman growing up in the ghettos of Detroit. The album cover reflected that sentiment as well. The album eventually went on to be certified platinum driven by their biggest selling single to date, "Love Child". It was a dynamic hot streak for Diana and The Supremes along with The Temptations as they had no less than 4 Top 10 albums by year's end. After a successful outing on Ed Sullivan, Berry Gordy crafted several projects for The Supremes and The Temptations including a top rated Neilsen television special and album, "T.C.B.". Unfortunately, the concert was recorded in August 1968, pre-empting hit singles like "Love Child" and "Cloud Nine" for the groups individually. The special would also not benefit from the pairings #1 single, "I'm Gonna Make You Love Me". In many ways, flooding the market with such strong material meant that several titles would compete for the #1 slot on the album and singles chart.

Covered songs on the LP include Bobby Taylor & the Vancouvers' "Does Your Mama Know About Me" (co-written by future comedian Tommy Chong) and Marvin Gaye & Tammi Terrell's "You Ain't Livin' Till You're Lovin'". Smokey Robinson's "He's My Sunny Boy" would later become the b-side to the final Diana Ross-led Supremes single, "Someday We'll Be Together" (1969), and Ashford & Simpson's "Keep an Eye" would later be rerecorded by Gladys Knight & the Pips for their 1969 album Nitty Gritty, and by Ross for her first solo LP, Diana Ross. "Can't Shake It Loose" was co-authored by George Clinton for Pat Lewis, later occasionally of The Andantes, who recorded it for Golden World in 1966. Clinton would later remake the song with his band Funkadelic in 1971, but that version would not be released until 1992, when it was included on the compilation Music For My Mother, as well as "Field Maneuvers", on the 1979 Funkadelic album Uncle Jam Wants You.

Track listing

Side one
 "Love Child"  – 2:58
 "Keep an Eye"  – 3:08
 "How Long Has That Evening Train Been Gone"  – 2:48
 "Does Your Mama Know About Me"  – 2:54
 "Honey Bee (Keep on Stinging Me)"  – 2:22
 "Some Things You Never Get Used To"  – 2:25

Side two
 "He's My Sunny Boy"  – 2:22
 "You've Been So Wonderful to Me"  – 2:34
 "(Don't Break These) Chains of Love"  – 2:25
 "You Ain't Livin' Till You're Lovin'"  – 2:44
 "I'll Set You Free"  – 2:40
 "Can't Shake It Loose"  – 2:09

Unused Recordings from the Love Child timeframe (March 1968-November 1968)
"The Beginning Of The End Of Love" (Richards-Taylor-Dean)
"Sweet Thing" (Robinson-Johnson-Cleveland)
"In The Evening Of Our Love" (Miner)
"Wish I Knew" (Richards-Dean) 
"If You Should Walk Away" (Wilson-Gordy)
"I Can't Give Back The Love I Feel For You" (Ashford-Simpson-Holland)
"Ain't No Sun Since You've Been Gone" (Whitfield-Moy-Grant)
"Those Precious Memories" (Wilson-Sawyer)
"Can't You See It's Me" (Goga-Hunter-Sawyer) (Released on their 1969 Cream of the Crop album.)
"When It's To The Top (Still I Won't Stop Giving You Love)" (Dean-Weatherspoon-Weatherspoon) (Released on their 1969 Cream of the Crop album.)

Personnel

Performers
 Diana Ross –  lead vocals
 Mary Wilson –  backing vocals (side 1: track 3; side 2: tracks 1, 2, and 5)
 Cindy Birdsong –  backing vocals (side 1: track 3; side 2: tracks 1, 2, and 5)
 The Andantes –  backing vocals (side 1: tracks 1, 3–5; side 2: track 3)
 Nickolas Ashford –  backing vocals (side 1: tracks 2 and 6; side 2: tracks 4 and 6)
 Valerie Simpson –  backing vocals (side 1: tracks 2 and 6; side 2: tracks 4 and 6)
 The Funk Brothers –  instrumentation (side 1: tracks 1 – 3, 5 and 6; all of side 2)
 Detroit Symphony Orchestra –  instrumentation (side 1: tracks 1 – 3, 5 and 6; side 2: tracks 2-5)
 Los Angeles-area session musicians –  instrumentation (side 1: track 4)

Production
 Nickolas Ashford, Valerie Simpson – producers, "Keep an Eye", "Some Things You'll Never Get Used To", "You Ain't Livin' Until You're Lovin'"
 R. Dean Taylor – producer, "Love Child"
 Frank Wilson –  producer, "How Long Has That Evening Train Been Gone", "Does Your Mama Know About Me", "Love Child"
 Deke Richards –  producer, "Honey Bee (Keep on Stinging Me)", "Does Your Mama Know About Me", "Love Child"
 Smokey Robinson – producer,  "He's My Sunny Boy"
 George Gordy – producer, "You've Been So Wonderful to Me"
 Harvey Fuqua – producer, "(Don't Break These) Chains Of Love"
 Johnny Bristol – producer, "(Don't Break These) Chains Of Love"
 Berry Gordy, Jr. – producer,  "I'll Set You Free", "Love Child"
 Henry Cosby – producer, "Can't Shake It Loose", "Love Child"

Charts

Weekly charts

Year-end charts

Notes

1968 albums
The Supremes albums
Albums produced by Johnny Bristol
Albums produced by Smokey Robinson
Albums produced by Ashford & Simpson
Albums produced by Berry Gordy
Albums produced by Harvey Fuqua
Albums produced by Frank Wilson (musician)
Albums produced by Henry Cosby
Albums produced by Deke Richards
Motown albums